Luca Moncada (born 3 April 1978 in Palermo) is an Italian rower.

References 
 

1978 births
Living people
Italian male rowers
Sportspeople from Palermo
World Rowing Championships medalists for Italy